Uravukku Kai Koduppom is a 1975 Indian Tamil-language drama film directed by Y. G. Mahendran, produced and written by K. S. Gopalakrishnan. It is based on Visu's play of the same name, also directed by Mahendran. The film stars Gemini Ganesan and Sowcar Janaki. It was released on 28 March 1975. Although a commercial failure, it was adapted by Visu into the film Samsaram Adhu Minsaram in 1986.

Plot

Cast 
 Gemini Ganesan
 Sowcar Janaki

Production 
Uravukku Kai Koduppom was the first play written by Visu, and directed by Y. G. Mahendran. K. S. Gopalakrishnan bought the rights to adapt the play into a film with the same name; besides producing the film under Chitra Productions, he also wrote the screenplay. Mahendran was retained as director.

Soundtrack 
The soundtrack was composed by D. B. Ramachandran and S. P. Venkatesh, with lyrics by A. Maruthakasi.

Release and reception 
Uravukku Kai Koduppom was released on 28 March 1975, and failed commercially. Kanthan of Kalki criticised the film for omitting the entertaining parts of the play, and Mahendran's direction. Despite the film's failure, it was adapted by Visu into the 1986 film Samsaram Adhu Minsaram.

References

External links 
 

1970s Tamil-language films
1975 drama films
1975 films
Films scored by D. B. Ramachandran
Films scored by S. P. Venkatesh
Films with screenplays by K. S. Gopalakrishnan
Indian drama films
Indian films based on plays